Kitsa may refer to:

Places
Kitsa, Estonia, a village in Hiiumaa County in Estonia
Kitsa, Russia, a railway station classified as a rural locality in Kolsky District of Murmansk Oblast, Russia

People
Kitsa Escobar, Puerto Rican handball player participating in 2011 Pan American Games
Kitsa, nickname of Katherine Schuyler Crosby, a sibling of Harry Crosby, American poet and publisher

See also
Mokraya Kitsa, a rural locality in Kolsky District of Murmansk Oblast, Russia
Evgenios Kitsas (b. 1982), association football player from Greece